The castra of Odorheiu Secuiesc was a fort built in the 1st century AD. A nearby contemporary settlement was also archeologically identified. The castra and the settlement were abandoned in the 3rd century. Their ruins are located in Odorheiu Secuiesc in Romania. At the same settlement, the ruins of a Roman tower can also be identified at Piatra Coţofană.

See also
List of castra

External links
Roman castra from Romania - Google Maps / Earth

Notes

Roman legionary fortresses in Romania
Ancient history of Transylvania
Historic monuments in Harghita County
Odorheiu Secuiesc